Inveran is a small village in the Parish of Creich located in the Sutherland region of the Highland Council area of Scotland.

It is situated on the A837 at the head of the Dornoch Firth and the site of the Shin Hydro-electric Power Station.

Inveran Inn was designed by the architect William Fowler.

References

Populated places in Sutherland